A. hirsutus may refer to:
 Acanthus hirsutus, a plant species
 Artocarpus hirsutus, the wild jack or jungle jack, a tree species native to India